Bradley Ritson (born 27 March 1982 in Durban, KwaZulu-Natal) is a retired South African football striker.
  
He worked as a plumber until he signed his first professional contract in 2008 joining AmaZulu from Stella FC, an amateur club in Durban. Ritson retired in 2013 and now works as a plumber again.

External links
 

1982 births
Living people
AmaZulu F.C. players
Association football forwards
Bidvest Wits F.C. players
Moroka Swallows F.C. players
Plumbers
South African builders
South African soccer players
Sportspeople from Durban
White South African people